Kevin Regan (born July 25, 1984) is an American former professional ice hockey goaltender. He played college ice hockey for the New Hampshire Wildcats, and once held the all-time leader in save percentage in Hockey East conference games.

Playing career
Born in South Boston, Massachusetts, Regan attended Saint Sebastian's School in Needham, Massachusetts. He began his career playing for the Waterloo Black Hawks of the USHL for the 2003–04 season. While playing in Waterloo he was one of the most successful goaltenders that the team has seen, setting team records for single season wins and shutouts. That year the Black Hawks reached the Clark Cup finals and Regan was named the Clark Cup MVP. A lifelong Boston Bruins fan, he was drafted by the Bruins in the ninth round (277 overall) of the 2003 NHL Entry Draft.

He then attended the University of New Hampshire from 2004 until 2008. In 2005 and 2007 UNH twice reached the Hockey East Championship game, only to lose to Boston College each time. They also advanced to the NCAA tournament each of the four seasons that Regan played. He received several awards his senior season and was a finalist for the Hobey Baker Award. He was a unanimous selection as the 2008 Hockey East Player of the Year and also won the Walter Brown Award for best American college hockey player in New England. In addition he was the All-Hockey East First Team goaltender and won Hockey East Defensive Player of the Week seven times. He also set the UNH record for single season save percentage and was the first UNH goaltender to win twenty games in two consecutive seasons. He graduated from UNH with a dual major in Finance and Economics. His high GPA earned him a spot on the Hockey East's All-Academic Team.

After graduating, he spent the 2008–09 and 2009–10 seasons in the American Hockey League and the ECHL. He was signed by the Providence Bruins in 2008, where he initially served as a backup to Tuukka Rask. While in the AHL he was hampered by hip injuries, including a torn labrum, that required multiple surgeries. He was briefly called up to the Boston Bruins in January 2009 but did not see any action. After recovering from his injuries he moved to Italy in 2010 to play for Hockey Club Valpellice of Serie A. At Valpellice he had eight teammates from North America. Following a return in 2012 to the United States with the Wichita Thunder in the CHL for one season, Regan returned to Europe, playing two seasons for the Fife Flyers, the continent's oldest hockey club. Heralded among the best all-time Fife Flyer keepers, Kevin Regan retired after the 2015 campaign.

Career statistics

Awards and honors

References

External links

1984 births
Alaska Aces (ECHL) players
American men's ice hockey goaltenders
Boston Bruins draft picks
Fife Flyers players
Gwinnett Gladiators players
Ice hockey people from Boston
Living people
New Hampshire Wildcats men's ice hockey players
Providence Bruins players
Reading Royals players
University of New Hampshire alumni
Waterloo Black Hawks players
AHCA Division I men's ice hockey All-Americans
American expatriate ice hockey players in Scotland
American expatriate ice hockey players in Canada
American expatriate ice hockey players in Italy